A pet exotic felid, also called pet wild cat or pet non-domestic cat, is a member of the family Felidae (excluding the house cat and hybrids thereof) kept as an exotic pet.

Definition and differentiations 
Hybrids of the domestic cat with non-domestic species (e. g. the Bengal cat or the Savannah cat) are not normally considered wild cats. While this distinction is often overlooked in the media and in the public eye, such cat breeds (especially the F5 and subsequent generations) are much closer to the domestic cat in terms of housing and husbandry requirements, behavior, and legality.

Unlike many other exotic pet species, wild cats usually cannot be kept indoors and require a large outdoor enclosure. This blurs the distinction between a wild cat being kept as an exotic pet and a private animal collection or menagerie. Usually, an enclosure meant for a pet exotic cat is built adjacent to the house in order to give the animal access into the living quarters.

Tame big cats kept by animal trainers (e. g. in circuses, private zoos or the film animal industry) are commonly mistaken for exotic pets. While the husbandry conditions and handling might be similar to a purely private setting, the common definition of a pet only includes animals kept for companionship or pleasure. Professional holders, breeders, or exhibitors do not meet this definition.

History 
Exotic felids have a long tradition in human care. The ancient Egyptians kept servals in the same role as the African Wildcat (the wild ancestor of modern house cats). Cheetahs have also been kept throughout the world, both as companions and as hunting aides. Caracals have also been tamed and trained, primarily by Arabian and Asian rulers. Other large cats sometimes were also kept as companions, but were mostly limited to menageries owned by royal families.Large cats have been keep as pets for hundreds of years.

Species kept as exotic pets 
In general, small cat species are more commonly kept as exotic pets than larger ones. Big cats are substantially more expensive to maintain, pose a greater danger when being handled in direct contact, and may not always remain handleable when fully grown. This typically limits their keeping to professional animal trainers and zoo settings.

Servals and caracals 
Servals and caracals have the longest history as human companions. Part of their popularity can be attributed to the fact that they readily hybridize with domestic cats. The resulting crosses (savannahs and caracats) inherit traits of both the domestic cat and the wild species. Like domestic cats they are sometimes kept as pest controllers.

Lynxes and bobcats 
Nearly all species of the genus Lynx (with the exception of the Iberian lynx) are kept as exotic pets. Unlike other small cat species, they are not known to hybridize with the domestic cat.

Ocelots 
Ocelots were popular as an exotic pet in the 50s and 60s. The passage of the Endangered Species Act in the United States effectively ended their keeping outside of zoological facilities due to interstate animal movement restrictions. Their popularity is also limited by their comparatively high aggression. No hybrids with domestic cats are known.

Pumas 
While being considered small cats taxonomically, pumas are comparable in size to some of the big cats. They are typically less aggressive and more affectionate than big cats, which has led to some popularity as exotic pets.

Cheetahs 
The cheetah has a long history as a human companion. However, difficulties in breeding prevented this species from becoming a widespread exotic pet in modern times.

Leopards 
Leopards were originally kept by royalty in Ancient Egypt; today it is a popular exotic pet due to its small size, exotic beauty and its striking coat featuring rosettes and spots. Black leopards are also kept as pets like their spotted counterparts.

Tigers 

Tigers were once only kept by royalty; today it is a popular exotic pet.

Lions 

Lions were also once only kept by royalty; today in some areas one has to have a permit to keep one; in some areas one can get one from the pet shop, while in other areas one may not own one. Lions are social animals; they accept their owners as part of the pride and form deep bonds.

See also 
 Exotic pet
 Feline Conservation Federation
 Lion taming

References 

Pets
Wildlife
Cats
Cats as pets
Exotic pets
Animal law
Domesticated animals